Hà Nội II Women's Football Club is a Vietnam women's football club, based in Hà Nội, Vietnam. The team will play in the Vietnam women's football championship.

The team is currently playing at Hà Đông Stadium.

History 
The club was founded in 1998 as Hà Tây W.F.C. in Hà Tây, Vietnam. In 2008, Hà Tây Province was subsumed into the city of Hanoi. So in 2009, the club was renamed Hà Nội II W.F.C. Now the club is the youth squad of Hà Nội I.

Honours

Domestic competitions

League
 Vietnam women's football championship
  Winners (1): 2006

Current squad
As of May 2017

References

External links

Women's football in Vietnam